Essa Mohhmad Humod Al Mehyani Al Hothaili  (born June 6, 1983) is a retired Saudi Arabian football player who played as a striker. He spent most of his career at Al-Wehda. He is a former Saudi international making 14 appearances for the national team. He is currently the assistant manager of Al-Wehda.

Club career statistics

Honours

Club
With Al-Hilal
Saudi Professional League: 2010, 2011.
Crown Prince Cup: 2009, 2010, 2011, 2012.

National team career statistics

U-20
2002 AFC Youth Championship: Third Place
2003 FIFA World Youth Championship: Group Stage

Individual
2002 AFC Youth Championship: Top Scores
2005–06 Saudi Premier League: Top Scores
2007–08 Arab Champions League: Top Scores

References

External links
Saudi League Profile

1983 births
Living people
Association football forwards
Saudi Arabian footballers
Al-Wehda Club (Mecca) players
Al Hilal SFC players
Al-Ahli Saudi FC players
Al-Shabab FC (Riyadh) players
Ittihad FC players
Najran SC players
Saudi Professional League players
Saudi Arabian football managers
Al-Wehda Club (Mecca) managers
Saudi Professional League managers